George Harry Cooke (20 November 1899–1977) was an English footballer who played in the Football League for Norwich City, Portsmouth, Southend United and Wigan Borough.

References

1899 births
1977 deaths
English footballers
Association football forwards
English Football League players
Bolsover Colliery F.C. players
Chesterfield F.C. players
Shirebrook Miners Welfare F.C. players
Norwich City F.C. players
Portsmouth F.C. players
Southend United F.C. players
Wigan Borough F.C. players
Mansfield Town F.C. players
Bradford (Park Avenue) A.F.C. players
Connah's Quay & Shotton F.C. players
Grantham Town F.C. players